Michele Liuzzi (born 23 February 1975) is an Italian wrestler. He competed in the men's freestyle 57 kg at the 1996 Summer Olympics.

References

1975 births
Living people
Italian male sport wrestlers
Olympic wrestlers of Italy
Wrestlers at the 1996 Summer Olympics
Sportspeople from Naples